A split in phylogenetics is a bipartition of a set of taxa, and the smallest unit of information in unrooted phylogenetic trees: each edge of an unrooted phylogenetic tree represents one split, and the tree can be efficiently reconstructed from its set of splits. Moreover, when given several trees, the splits occurring in more than half of these trees give rise to a consensus tree, and the splits occurring in a smaller fraction of the trees generally give rise to a consensus Split Network.

See also 
SplitsTree, a program for inferring phylogenetic (split) networks.

References 

Phylogenetics
Trees (data structures)